Elizabeth Cuthrell is a writer, producer and co-founder of Evenstar Films, a New York City-based Production company.

Film career
Elizabeth Cuthrell produced The Same Storm, written and directed by Peter Hedges, and starring Elaine May, Mary-Louise Parker, Noma Dumezweni, Sandra Oh, Judith Light, Joel de la Fuente, and Moses Ingram. The film premiered at Telluride Film Festival. Cuthrell produced The Sisterhood of Night starring Kal Penn, Laura Fraser, Kara Hayward, Georgie Henley, Willa Cuthrell and Olivia DeJonge, which premiered at The Woodstock Film Festival (winner of the Tangerine Entertainment Juice Award), and was released in 2015. Cuthrell executive produced Vara: A Blessing (directed by Khyentse Norbu), which opened the 2013 Busan International Film Festival, and played festivals worldwide including the London BFI Film Festival, and the Tribeca Film Festival (winner, Best Online Feature). Cuthrell also produced Kelly Reichardt's film Meek's Cutoff, starring Michelle Williams, which was in competition at the Venice Film Festival (winner, Signis Ecumenical Award), as well as the Toronto, Sundance, and New York Film Festivals, and wrote and produced the award-winning film Jesus' Son, starring Billy Crudup, Samantha Morton, Dennis Hopper, Jack Black, and Holly Hunter. Jesus' Son was also in competition at the Venice Film Festival (winner, Little Golden Lion and Signis Ecumenical Awards), as well as the Telluride, Venice, New Directors/New Films, and Toronto Film Festivals.

Theater
Cuthrell produced Farinelli and The King on Broadway (starring Mark Rylance). Additional theater credits include the recent world premiere of Slut, the New York premiere of Denis Johnson's Shoppers Carried by Escalators into the Flames (starring Will Patton and Michael Shannon), Roger Rees's one-man show What You Will at ACT in San Francisco, and Jonathan Cott's Walt and Emily: Between the Rooms at the Cherry Lane Theater.

Public service announcements
Cuthrell also wrote and produced (along with Mary-Louise Parker) a series of public service announcements called Stop the Hate for the Ad Council, which urged tolerance for Arab Americans and people of color after the attacks of 9/11. For her work on Stop the Hate, Cuthrell was awarded the Courage Award, given by the Los Angeles County Human Relations Commission.

Education
Cuthrell attended the University of Hawaii and the University of Pennsylvania and received her MFA from NYU's Tisch School of the Arts.

References

External links
 
 Evenstar Films website
 The Sisterhood of Night Producers
 Video Clips, Evenstar Films
 Jesus' Son Announcement
 The Sisterhood of Night Review
 Vara: A Blessing Review
 Meek's Cutoff Review
 Jesus' Son Review

American film producers
Living people
American women film producers
Year of birth missing (living people)
21st-century American women